thumb|Jonathan Knight painted by Nathaniel Jocelyn, 1827
Jonathan Knight (September 4, 1789 – August 25, 1864) was an American physician and founding professor of the Yale Medical School.

He was a son of Dr. Jonathan Knight, a Surgeon's mate in the Continental Army, and was born in Norwalk, Connecticut.  His mother was a daughter of Dr. Asahel Fitch, of Reading, Connecticut.

He graduated from Yale College in 1808.  For two years after graduation he taught school in Norwich
and New London, Connecticut and was next a Tutor in Yale College for one year.  He then attended two annual courses of medical lectures in the University of Pennsylvania, having already been licensed to practice, by the Connecticut Medical Society, in August, 1811. He received the honorary degree of M. D from Yale College in 1818.

The Medical Institution of Yale College was organized in 1813, and he was appointed the Professor of Anatomy and Physiology. He continued in this post for twenty-five years, when he was transferred to the Chair of Surgery. After having lectured for more than fifty years to successive classes of students, he resigned all connection with the college, in May, 1864. For many years, in addition to his duties in the medical school, he lectured on Anatomy and Physiology to the Senior class in the Academical Department. During all his
residence in New Haven, Connecticut he was engaged in extensive practice. He was President in 1846 and 1847 of the Convention which formed the American Medical Association, and was also President of the Association itself in 1853. At the time of his death he was President of the American Mutual Life Insurance Company.  The Knight Hospital of the U. S Government in New Haven, now the Yale–New Haven Hospital, was named in his honor.

He died in New Haven, aged 75 years, nearly.  A funeral discourse by Rev. Dr Bacon, and a commemorative
sketch by Prof. F Bacon, M. D., were printed.

External links

1789 births
1864 deaths
Yale College alumni
Yale School of Medicine faculty
People from Norwalk, Connecticut
19th-century American physicians
Presidents of the American Medical Association